The sixth and final season of The Fresh Prince of Bel-Air premiered on September 18, 1995 and concluded on May 20, 1996.

Plot 
In the series finale, the main characters all move out of the Banks Mansion to move on with their lives. Hilary's talk show moves to New York City; Ashley moves to New York with Hilary; Carlton transfers to Princeton University; Geoffrey moves back to England to be with his son; Philip, Vivian and Nicky move to New York to be closer to the rest of the family; and Will remains in California to finish his college studies. Will Smith, James Avery, Alfonso Ribeiro, Tatyana Ali, and Joseph Marcell appear in all episodes. Karyn Parsons was absent for one episode (ep. 4). Daphne Maxwell Reid was absent for five episodes and Ross Bagley was absent for eight episodes. DJ Jazzy Jeff appears in five episodes this season.

Episodes

References

External links
 
 

1995 American television seasons
1996 American television seasons
The Fresh Prince of Bel-Air seasons